The next-generation network (NGN) is a body of key architectural changes in telecommunication core and access networks. The general idea behind the NGN is that one network transports all information and services (voice, data, and all sorts of media such as video) by encapsulating these into IP packets, similar to those used on the Internet. NGNs are commonly built around the Internet Protocol, and therefore the term all IP is also sometimes used to describe the transformation of formerly telephone-centric networks toward NGN.

NGN is a different concept from Future Internet, which is more focused on the evolution of Internet in terms of the variety and interactions of services offered.

Introduction of NGN 

According to ITU-T, the definition is:
A next-generation network (NGN) is a packet-based network which can provide services including Telecommunication Services and is able to make use of multiple broadband, quality of service-enabled transport technologies and in which service-related functions are independent from underlying transport-related technologies. It offers unrestricted access by users to different service providers. It supports generalized mobility which will allow consistent and ubiquitous provision of services to users.

From a practical perspective, NGN involves three main architectural changes that need to be looked at separately:

 In the core network, NGN implies a consolidation of several (dedicated or overlay) transport networks each historically built for a different service into one core transport network (often based on IP and Ethernet). It implies amongst others the migration of voice from a circuit-switched architecture (PSTN) to VoIP, and also migration of legacy services such as X.25, Frame Relay (either commercial migration of the customer to a new service like IP VPN, or technical emigration by emulation of the "legacy service" on the NGN).
 In the wired access network, NGN implies the migration from the dual system of legacy voice next to xDSL setup in local exchanges to a converged setup in which the DSLAMs integrate voice ports or VoIP, making it possible to remove the voice switching infrastructure from the exchange.
 In the cable access network, NGN convergence implies migration of constant bit rate voice to CableLabs PacketCable standards that provide VoIP and SIP services. Both services ride over DOCSIS as the cable data layer standard.

In an NGN, there is a more defined separation between the transport (connectivity) portion of the network and the services that run on top of that transport. This means that whenever a provider wants to enable a new service, they can do so by defining it directly at the service layer without considering the transport layer – i.e. services are independent of transport details. Increasingly applications, including voice, tend to be independent of the access network (de-layering of network and applications) and will reside more on end-user devices (phone, PC, set-top box).

Underlying technology components 
Next-generation networks are based on Internet technologies including Internet Protocol (IP) and multiprotocol label switching (MPLS). At the application level, Session Initiation Protocol (SIP) seems to be taking over from ITU-T H.323.

Initially H.323 was the most popular protocol, though its popularity decreased in the "local loop" due to its original poor traversal of network address translation (NAT) and firewalls. For this reason as domestic VoIP services have been developed, SIP has been more widely adopted. However, in voice networks where everything is under the control of the network operator or telco, many of the largest carriers use H.323 as the protocol of choice in their core backbones. With the most recent changes introduced for H.323, it is now possible for H.323 devices to easily and consistently traverse NAT and firewall devices, opening up the possibility that H.323 may again be looked upon more favorably in cases where such devices encumbered its use previously. Nonetheless, most of the telcos are extensively researching and supporting IP Multimedia Subsystem (IMS), which gives SIP a major chance of being the most widely adopted protocol.

For voice applications one of the most important devices in NGN is a Softswitch – a programmable device that controls Voice over IP (VoIP) calls. It enables correct integration of different protocols within NGN. The most important function of the Softswitch is creating the interface to the existing telephone network, PSTN, through Signalling Gateways and Media Gateways. However, the Softswitch as a term may be defined differently by the different equipment manufacturers and have somewhat different functions.

One may quite often find the term Gatekeeper in NGN literature. This was originally a VoIP device, which converted (using gateways) voice and data from their analog or digital switched-circuit form (PSTN, SS7) to the packet-based one (IP). It controlled one or more gateways. As soon as this kind of device started using the Media Gateway Control Protocol, the name was changed to Media Gateway Controller (MGC).

A Call Agent is a general name for devices/systems controlling calls.

The IP Multimedia Subsystem (IMS) is a standardised NGN architecture for an Internet media-services capability defined by the European Telecommunications Standards Institute (ETSI) and the 3rd Generation Partnership Project (3GPP).

Implementations 
In the UK, another popular acronym was introduced by BT (British Telecom) as 21CN (21st Century Networks, sometimes mistakenly quoted as C21N) — this is another loose term for NGN and denotes BT's initiative to deploy and operate NGN switches and networks in the period 2006–2008 (the aim being by 2008 BT to have only all-IP switches in their network). The concept was abandoned, however, in favor of maintaining current-generation equipment.

The first company in the UK to roll out a NGN was THUS plc which started deployment back in 1999. THUS' NGN contains 10,600 km of fibre optic cable with more than 190 points of presence throughout the UK. The core optical network uses dense wavelength-division multiplexing (DWDM) technology to provide scalability to many hundreds of gigabits per second of bandwidth, in line with growth demand. On top of this, the THUS backbone network uses MPLS technology to deliver the highest possible performance. IP/MPLS-based services carry voice, video and data traffic across a converged infrastructure, potentially allowing organisations to enjoy lower infrastructure costs, as well as added flexibility and functionality. Traffic can be prioritised with Classes of Service, coupled with Service Level Agreements (SLAs) that underpin quality of service performance guarantees. The THUS NGN accommodates seven Classes of Service, four of which are currently offered on MPLS IP VPN.

In the Netherlands, KPN is developing an NGN in a network transformation program called all-IP. Next Generation Networks also extends into the messaging domain and in Ireland, Openmind Networks has designed, built and deployed Traffic Control to handle the demands and requirements of all IP networks.

In Bulgaria, BTC (Bulgarian Telecommunications Company) has implemented the NGN as underlying network of its telco services on a large-scale project in 2004. The inherent flexibility and scalability of the new core network approach resulted in an unprecedented rise of classical services deployment as POTS/ISDN, Centrex, ADSL, VPN, as well as implementation of higher bandwidths for the Metro and Long-distance Ethernet / VPN services, cross-national transits and WebTV/IPTV application.

In February 2014, Deutsche Telekom revealed that its subsidiary Makedonski Telekom had become the first European incumbent to convert its PSTN infrastructure to an all IP network. It took just over two years for all 290,000 fixed lines to be migrated onto the new platform. The capital investment worth 14 million euros makes Macedonia the first country in the South-East Europe whose network will be fully based on Internet protocol.

In Canada, startup Wind Mobile owned by Globalive is deploying an all-ip wireless backbone for its mobile phone service.

In mid 2005, China Telecom announced its commercial roll-out of China Telecom's Next Generation Carrying Network, or CN2, using Internet Protocol Next-Generation Network (IP NGN) architecture. Its IPv6-capable backbone network leverages softswitches (the control layer) and protocols like DiffServ and MPLS, which boosts performance of its bearer layer. The MPLS-optimized architecture also enables Frame Relay and ATM traffic to be transported over a Layer 2 VPN, which supports both legacy traffic and new IP services over a single IP/MPLS network.

See also 
 Bezeq
 Computer network
 Fixed-Mobile Convergence Alliance (FMCA)
 Flat IP
 Mobile VoIP
 IP Multimedia Subsystem (IMS)
 Nanoscale network
 Network convergence
 Next-generation network services
 Telecommunications equipment

References 

 Migrating TDM Networks to NGN | A US Case Study

External links 
 ETSI TISPAN website
 ECMA TR/91 "Enterprise Communication in Next Generation Corporate Networks (NGCN) involving Public Next Generation Networks (NGN) (Ecma-International, December 2005)" (also ISO/IEC DTR 26905 and ETSI TR 102 478)
 ITU-T Focus Group on Next Generation Networks (FGNGN)
 ITU-T NGN Management Focus Group
 NGN enabled label
 NGN Forum

Network architecture
Network protocols